Joseph Mario Roberge (born January 23, 1964) is a Canadian former professional ice hockey forward who played 112 games in the National Hockey League (NHL) for the Montreal Canadiens between 1990 and 1995.

Playing career
Roberge was born in Quebec City, Quebec. As a youth, he played in the 1977 Quebec International Pee-Wee Hockey Tournament with a minor ice hockey team from Quebec City. 

Roberge started his NHL career with the Montreal Canadiens, in 1991.  He played his entire career with Montreal and left after the 1995 season.  He won one Stanley Cup, with Montreal, in 1993, his most successful season; when he played a career-high 50 games, scored four goals and added four assists. Three of his goals were game winners.  He also added a career-high 142 minutes in penalties.  He played three playoff games, helping the Canadiens win their 24th Stanley Cup.  Roberge was mostly known for his physical play and his fighting abilities. He earned 314 penalty minutes in 112 NHL games. 

He is the brother of former NHL player Serge Roberge.

Career statistics

Regular season and playoffs

References

External links

1964 births
Living people
Canadian ice hockey left wingers
Chicoutimi Saguenéens (QMJHL) players
Fredericton Canadiens players
Ice hockey people from Quebec City
Ligue Nord-Américaine de Hockey players
Mohawk Valley Prowlers players
Montreal Canadiens players
Quebec Rafales players
Quebec Remparts players
Sherbrooke Canadiens players
Stanley Cup champions
Undrafted National Hockey League players
Virginia Lancers (ACHL) players